Beron may refer to:

People
 Grégory Beron (born 1989), French ice hockey defenceman
 Patty Beron, social media pioneer known for Sfgirl.com
 Petar Beron (1799–1871), Bulgarian educator
 Petar Beron (politician) (born 1940), Bulgarian academic and politician

Places
 Berón de Astrada Department, Argentina
 Beron Point, Antarctica
 Saint-Béron, France